The 1901 All-Western college football team consists of American football players selected to the All-Western teams chosen by various selectors for the 1901 college football season.

All-Western selections

Ends
 William Juneau, Wisconsin (CA, CDN-1, CRH, CT, WC)
 Neil Snow, Michigan (CA, CDN-1 [fullback], CRH, WC) (CFHOF)
 Rogers, Minnesota (CDN-2, CT)
 Allen Abbott, Wisconsin (CDN-1)
 Albert Herrnstein, Michigan (CDN-2)

Tackles
 Bruce Shorts, Michigan (CA, CDN-2, CRH, CT, WC)
 Arthur Hale Curtis, Wisconsin (CA, CDN-1, CRH, CT)
 Charles G. Flanagan, Chicago (WC)
 Charles W. Fee, Minnesota (CDN-1)
 Hugh White, Michigan (CDN-2)

Guards
 John G. Flynn, Minnesota (CA, CDN-2, CRH, WC)
 Jake Stahl, Illinois (CA, CDN-1, CRH, CT)
 Arnie Lerum, Wisconsin (WC)
 Edward S. Merrill, Beloit (CT)
 Eben Wilson, Michigan (CDN-2)

Centers
 Fred Lowenthal, Illinois (CA, CT, WC)
 Leroy Albert Page, Jr., Minnesota (CDN-1, CRH)
 Emil Skow, Wisconsin (CDN-2)

Quarterbacks
 Boss Weeks, Michigan (CA, CDN-1, CRH, WC)
 George H. Garrey, Chicago (CT)
 Albert Marshall, Wisconsin (CDN-2)

Halfbacks
 Willie Heston, Michigan (CA, CRH, WC) (CFHOF)
 Al Larson, Wisconsin (CA, CDN-1, CRH, CT, WC)
 Eddie Cochems, Wisconsin (CDN-2, CT)
 James M. Sheldon, Chicago (CDN-2)

Fullbacks
 Everett Sweeley, Michigan (CDN-1 [halfback], CT)
 G. O. Dietz, Northwestern (CDN-1 [guard], WC)
 Earl Driver, Wisconsin (CA, CDN-2, CRH)

Key
CA = Chicago American

CDN = Chicago Daily News

CRH= Chicago Record-Herald

CT = Chicago Tribune

WC = Walter Camp

CFHOF = College Football Hall of Fame

See also
1901 College Football All-America Team

References

All-Western team
All-Western college football teams